This is a family tree of monarchs of Navarre from Íñigo Arista until the accession of Henry III of Navarre to the throne of France.

The colors denote the monarchs from the:

  - House of Íñiguez (824–905)

 - House of Jiménez (905–1234)

 - House of Champagne (Blois) (1234–1284)

 - House of Capet (1284–1349)

 - House of Évreux (1328–1441)

 - House of Trastámara (1425–1479)

 - House of Foix (1479–1517)

 - House of Albret (1484–1572)

 - House of Bourbon (1572–1620)

——  The solid lines denotes the legitimate descents

– – – - The dashed lines denotes a marriage 

· · · · The dotted lines denotes the liaisons and illegitimate descents

Image

See also
List of Navarrese monarchs
Kingdom of Navarre
Kingdom of Pamplona

Navarre, Kings of